Kuşak is a village in the Kemaliye District of Erzincan Province in Turkey.

References

Villages in Kemaliye District